To surrender in spirituality and religion means that a believer completely gives up his own will and subjects his thoughts, ideas, and deeds to the will and teachings of a higher power. It may also be contrasted with Submission. Surrender is willful acceptance and yielding to a dominating force and their will.

Christianity

In Christianity, the first main principle of surrender is "Dying to Self", or "The Carrying of Your Cross" allowing Christ to reign and rule in the order of how one's life is carried out, illustrated in the following passages: 

Another principle central to the Christian concept of surrender is the concept of surrender to God's Will. Surrendering to God's will entails both the surrender of our will to His, in His sovereignty over all things, in which His ways of operating and thinking prevails over humanity's and Satan's. Secondarily, the surrender of one's will is evidenced by the acknowledgement of God's will for our personal lives in even the smallest decisions. This is done through putting personal desire aside in favor of God's perfect will for our lives. This includes the reality of an acceptance to a calling or purpose. The precipice or essentiality of this personal surrender is obedience, and obedience to God is an indication of bringing about His will. Which, having lasting effects through generations, and in kingdoms/nations, is often associated with earthly and heavenly blessings.

The ultimate surrender; the surrender of Christ, which is a fully submitted will to God's Divine plan, is seen in Christ's birth as well as His final three prayers, in Gethsemane, before His crucifixion. The coming into the world as God incarnate and then the surrender to the Cross/His life in the act of sacrificial atonement, breaking the curse of sin and death from the Fall.

This is evidenced in the following:

Surrender is also noted in Christian doctrine as one of the three columns of victorious living, or Christian victory: the Blood of the Lamb [Christ], their Testimony of the Word of God [Scriptures] and their lives, and Loving not their own lives to death; that Christ's life may be shown.

The Christian Flag, which represents all of Christendom, has a white field, with a red Latin cross inside a blue canton. In conventional vexillology, a white flag is linked to surrender, a reference to the Biblical description Jesus' non-violence and surrender to God's will.

Hinduism
According to the Bhagavad Gita, Krishna said the following to the warrior Arjuna, who became his disciple:

Several gurus teach their disciples the importance of surrender to God or to themselves, as part of the guru-disciple relationship. For example, the Sri Sai Satcharita, the biography of Sai Baba of Shirdi says that surrender to the guru is the only sadhana.

Prem Rawat, formerly called Guru Maharaj Ji, was quoted in 1978 "But there is nothing to understand! And if there is something to understand, there is only one thing to understand, and that is to surrender!"

Contrary to the notion of surrendering onto God, Krishna in Bhagavad Gita also advises his followers to question everything in pursuit of absolute truth.

Islam
The concept of  surrender is when a person abides by the five main Pillars of Islam.  following the faith means surrendering or submitting one's will to God. This means that Muslims in their daily life should strive for excellence under the banner of God's will. Every single action in a Muslim's life, whether marriage or building one's career, should theoretically be for the sake of God.

See also
 Saranagati
 Ibadah

References and notes

Religious practices